"Carmelita" is a country rock song written by Warren Zevon. The song was originally recorded by Canadian singer Murray McLauchlan on his self-titled album of 1972. Zevon himself recorded it four years later, in 1976, on his self titled album. Linda Ronstadt recorded a well known version in 1977, and various covers have followed. These include a folk version by infamous punk rocker GG Allin - a version rumored to feature Linda Ronstadt herself (under the soubriquet 'The Razor') on backing vocals - and a later rendition by the folk-punk group Lost Dog Street Band. Flaco Jimenez (Texas Tornados, Los Super Seven) recorded a version featuring Dwight Yoakam for his 1992 album Partners. More recently, it’s been recorded by punk bands The Copyrights and FIDLAR.

Izaak Opatz version

Izaak Opatz covered the song on his EP Mariachi Static B-Sides. It was released July 13, 2018.

After releasing his debut album Mariachi Static in 2016, Opatz released a follow-up EP in July 2018. The album, Mariachi Static, got its title from a lyric in Zevon's Carmelita, and opens with, “I hear mariachi static on my radio, and the tubes they glow in the dark, and I’m there with her in Ensenada, and I’m here in Echo Park.” Opatz recorded his own take on “Carmelita,” which also appeared on Zevon’s 1976 self titled album. Opatz pays homage to the laid-back longing of the track, but adds a little rock and plenty of grit, bookending verses with crunchy guitar and employing a bare-bones production style that gives the listener the sense of being in the room as the band plays.

References

1976 songs
Warren Zevon songs
Linda Ronstadt songs
Songs about California
Songs about Los Angeles
Songs about heroin
Counting Crows songs
The Wildhearts songs
Songs written by Warren Zevon